Wysox may refer to:

Wysox Township, Carroll County, Illinois
Wysox Township, Bradford County, Pennsylvania
Wysox Creek, a tributary of the Susquehanna River in Pennsylvania